Weare may refer to:

Weare (surname)
Weare, New Hampshire, USA
Weare, Somerset, England
Weare Giffard, Devon, England
Weare Township, Michigan, USA

See also 
 Wearing (disambiguation)